Air Marshal Sir Eric Clive Dunn,  (27 November 1927 – 16 July 2008) was a senior Royal Air Force officer.

Born in Winchester on 27 November 1927 to the son of Royal Air Force Wing Commander he was educated at Bridlington School, East Riding of Yorkshire, and joined the RAF as an aircraft apprentice in February 1944.

Following three years at No 1 Radio School at RAF Cranwell, Dunn graduated in second place as a radio fitter (air). At this point, he missed his first opportunity for an RAF commission, being very unlucky not to be selected for a cadetship.  Dunn won his colours every year in rugby and cricket, excelling to win the Victor Ludorum shield for outstanding sportsmanship.

Dunn was soon posted to Hong Kong to work on the flying boats, where Dunn volunteered for many missions during the Korean War. Dunn was an essential member for the crew in many of the missions as they lasted so long – some up to eighteen hours, and Dunn was responsible for the maintenance of the on-board navigation, electrical and radio equipment.  Due to his efforts Dunn, then a corporal, was award the British Empire Medal (BEM).

After returning to England in 1951, Dunn was selected for a commission within the engineering branch of the RAF.

Dunn retired in July 1986 and for four years was a director at Deutsch (then, Hellerman Deutsch).

Dunn died on 16 July 2008 aged 80, leaving his wife and three daughters.

References

External links 
 RAF Cranwell Apprentices Association – Photos
 RAF Cranwell Apprentices Association – Memorial at the National Memorial Arboretum

1927 births
2008 deaths
Companions of the Order of the Bath
Fellows of the Royal Aeronautical Society
Knights Commander of the Order of the British Empire
Royal Air Force air marshals
Recipients of the British Empire Medal
Royal Air Force personnel of the Falklands War
English rugby union players
Royal Air Force personnel of the Korean War
Trenchard Brats
People educated at Bridlington School
Sportspeople from Yorkshire
Military personnel from Winchester
Royal Air Force personnel of World War II
Rugby union players from Winchester